Plummer House may refer to:

Plummer House (Beebe, Arkansas), listed on the NRHP in Arkansas
John A. Plummer House, Marianna, AR, listed on the NRHP in Arkansas
Capt. John Plummer House, Addison, ME, listed on the NRHP in Maine
 Plummer House (Rochester, Minnesota), listed on the NRHP in Minnesota as "Henry S. Plummer House"
Plummer Homestead, Milton, NH, listed on the NRHP in New Hampshire
Amos and Lillie Plummer House, Hillsboro, ND, listed on the NRHP in North Dakota
Baty-Plummer House, Paris, TX, listed on the NRHP in Texas